The 2015 Mid-American Conference baseball tournament was held from May 20 through 24.  The top eight regular season finishers of the conference's twelve teams, regardless of division, met in the double-elimination tournament held at All Pro Freight Stadium in Avon, Ohio.  The Ohio Bobcats won the tournament and earned the conference's automatic bid to the 2015 NCAA Division I baseball tournament.

Seeding and format
The winners of each division claim the top two seeds, with the remaining six spots in the field determined by conference winning percentage, regardless of division.  Teams then play a two bracket, double-elimination tournament leading to a single elimination final.

Results

References

Tournament
Mid-American Conference baseball tournament
Mid-American Conference baseball tournament
Mid-American Conference Baseball Tournament